Mariëtte Jacoba Geertruida "Mariët" Dommers (born 19 March 1948) is a former diver from the Netherlands. She competed at the 1968 and 1972 Summer Olympics in springboard and finished in 18th and 23rd position, respectively. 

After marriage in 1973 she changed her last name to 'Van der Want'.

References

1948 births
Living people
Dutch female divers
Divers at the 1968 Summer Olympics
Divers at the 1972 Summer Olympics
Olympic divers of the Netherlands
People from Manado
Sportspeople from North Sulawesi
20th-century Dutch women